In abstract algebra, a structurable algebra is a certain kind of unital involutive non-associative algebra over a field. For example, all Jordan algebras are structurable algebras (with the trivial involution), as is any alternative algebra with involution, or any central simple algebra with involution. An involution here means a linear anti-homomorphism whose square is the identity.

Structurable algebras were introduced by Allison in 1978. The Kantor–Koecher–Tits construction produces a Lie algebra from any Jordan algebra, and this construction can be generalized so that a Lie algebra can be produced from an structurable algebra. Moreover, Allison proved over fields of characteristic zero that a structurable algebra is central simple if and only if the corresponding Lie algebra is central simple.

Another example of a structurable algebra is a 56-dimensional non-associative algebra originally studied by Brown in 1963, which can be constructed out of an Albert algebra. When the base field is algebraically closed over characteristic not 2 or 3, the automorphism group of such an algebra has identity component equal to the simply connected exceptional algebraic group of type E6.

References

Non-associative algebras